On The Shevchenko Monument is a bronze and granite monument of Taras Shevchenko, created by Leo Mol, that was unveiled on 26 June 2011 in Ottawa, Ontario, Canada.

The composition of the monument includes four items: Taras Shevchenko, and three bas-relief figures complementing the composition. Dressed in a long coat, the fashion at that time, he holds a palette and three paintbrushes and looks out into the distance.

Three shorter bases hold artistic creations from his poetry. One of the bas-relief figures, standing  and weighing , represents Haydamaky (referring to Haidamakas) an epic poem of Shevchenko's about the Cossack paramilitary bands that rose up against the szlachta (Polish nobility) in right-bank Ukraine in the 18th-century.

The next, Kateryna with child, recalls his early ballad about a Ukrainian girl seduced then abandoned by a Russian - symbolic of the tsarist imposition of serfdom in Ukraine and refers to Shevchenko's painting Kateryna.

The last, Banduryst, referring to the Kobzar and Bandura, a traditional Ukrainian stringed musical instrument shaped like a lute.

Nearly  of Stanstead grey granite from Quebec, was used to create the bases for the monument.

The monument is located the grounds of the Saint John the Baptist Ukrainian Catholic Shrine, 952 Green Valley Crescent, Ottawa, Ontario.

References

View the images, videos and links of the Taras Shevchenko Monument unveiling ceremony and concert
of June 26, 2011 - 

The unveiling event included a tree planting ceremony using soil brought from Kaniv, Ukraine. The monument unveiling in Ottawa was planned to coincide with the 120 year anniversary of Ukrainian immigration to Canada, 20 years of Ukrainian independence, and 150 years of Shevchenko's death.

Facebook Page for Taras-Shevchenko-Monument-in-Ottawa - 

Download the trilingual Commemorative Booklet (40 pages) - 

History of the monument and its construction -   - 

List of monument donors -

Additional References

Monuments and memorials in Ottawa
2011 sculptures
2011 establishments in Ontario
Monuments and memorials to Taras Shevchenko